Ancharius fuscus is a species of catfish in the family Anchariidae. It is commonly referred to as the vaona but this name also refers to Gogo brevibarbis. It is endemic to Madagascar where it is found in the eastern draining rivers.  Its natural habitat is rivers.  It is threatened by habitat loss.  A. fuscus grows to about 30.0 centimetres (11.8 in) TL.

See also
 Ancharius (fish)
 Ancharius griseus

References

Sources
 

fuscus
Freshwater fish of Madagascar
Taxonomy articles created by Polbot
Fish described in 1880